Below are the rosters for teams competing in the 2000 World Junior Ice Hockey Championships.

Group A

Head coach:  Jaroslav Holík

Head coach:  Claude Julien

Head coach:  Jeff Jackson

Head coach:  Hannu Kapanen

Head coach:  Dušan Žiška

Group B

Head coach:  Petr Vorobiev

Head coach:  Lars Molin

Head coach:  Jakob Kölliker

Head coach:  Vasily Vasilchenko

Head coach:  Olexander Kulikov

References
 IIHF Official Results – Top Division

Rosters
World Junior Ice Hockey Championships rosters